Sand Run is a stream located entirely within Summit County, Ohio. It is a tributary of the Cuyahoga River.

Sand Run was named for the sandstone outcroppings in the area.

See also
List of rivers of Ohio

References

Rivers of Summit County, Ohio
Rivers of Ohio